Joy Deep as Sorrow is Bob Bennett's ninth solo album; his second self-released solo album. 

For this release, Bob Bennett raised $15,000 through kickstarter.com to fund the recording and production of the CD.

Track listing
All songs written by Bob Bennett, except where noted as "(words / music)".

"Joy Deep as Sorrow" - (4:45)
"Birth of a Song" (Steve Bell) - (4:47)
"Faithful" - (4:04)
"Playing the Part of Me" - (2:48)
"Two or More" - (4:43)
"Strange Joy" - (4:26)
"Broken Beauty" (John Buller/Bob Bennett) - (4:03)
"You Went Ahead" - (3:59)
"Panhandled at the Western Wall" - (4:31)
"God My Shepherd" - (3:39)
"A Moveable Feast" - (4:05)

Personnel
Bob Bennett – acoustic guitar, electric guitar (5), vocals, composer
Roy Salmond – producer, recording, accordion (9), basses (except 4/9), drums (11) electric guitars (except 4/6), keyboards (except 4/9), percussion, piano, programming, psalter (6), pump organ (10). 
Bill Batstone - upright bass (4), fretless bass (9)
Gayle Salmond - vocal (3)
Janaya Salmond - drums (except 11)
Mike Janzen - rhodes (4/9/)
Bob Somma - electric guitar (4/9)

Release history
Joy Deep as Sorrow was released by Bob Bennett on December 14,  2012.

References

Bob Bennett (singer-songwriter) albums